The Basketball Bundesliga 2011–12 was the 46th season of the Basketball Bundesliga (BBL). Brose Baskets from Bamberg won its third straight title this season, by beating ratiopharm Ulm 3–0 in the Finals.

Teams

PO: Playoff; Rel: Relegation; Pro A: Division below BBL

Main round standings

Playoffs

See also
 Basketball Bundesliga 2010–11
 German champions

References

External links
German League official website 

Basketball Bundesliga seasons
German
2011–12 in German basketball